Carl John Butkus (December 26, 1922 – August 3, 1978) was an American football offensive tackle in the National Football League for the Washington Redskins and the New York Giants. He also played in the All-America Football Conference for the New York Yankees. He played college football at George Washington University.

Military service 
Butkus served in the United States Army in the World War II era and achieved the rank of sergeant.

References

External links

1922 births
1978 deaths
American football offensive tackles
American people of Lithuanian descent
George Washington Colonials football players
New York Giants players
New York Yankees (AAFC) players
Players of American football from Pennsylvania
Sportspeople from Scranton, Pennsylvania
Washington Redskins players
United States Army soldiers
United States Army personnel of World War II